During the 1985–86 English football season, Aston Villa competed in the Football League First Division.

Diary of the season
10 July 1985 – Everton sell striker Andy Gray to Aston Villa for £150,000, six years after he first left Villa Park to sign for Wolves. The departure of Gray from Goodison Park comes despite calls from fans for manager Howard Kendall to retain the striker who played a crucial role in Everton winning three major trophies in his two seasons at the club.

17 August 1985 – The Football League season begins. FA Cup holders Manchester United beat Aston Villa 4–0 at Old Trafford. The season begins without any live coverage of matches on TV for an indefinite period after the collapse of talks between ITV and the Football League to show live matches this season.

4 September 1985 – Midweek clashes in the First Division see  a 3–0 away win for Villa over local rivals West Bromwich Albion.

8 October 1985 – A Football League Cup second round second leg scoring spree at Villa Park sees Aston Villa beat Exeter City 8–1 to make the aggregate score 12–2 over two legs.

19 October 1985 – The First Division scene produces a string of thrilling matches. West Ham's climb up the table continues with a 4–1 home win over Villa. West Bromwich Albion finally win a league game at the 13th attempt by beating their local rivals Birmingham City 2–1 at The Hawthorns.

26 November 1985 – League Cup fourth round action sees Aston Villa win 2–1 away to local rivals West Bromwich Albion.

29 November 1985 – Manchester United sign Aston Villa midfielder Colin Gibson for £275,000.

7 December 1985 – Kenny Dalglish's team beat Aston Villa 3–0 at Anfield.

14 December 1985 – Manchester United move five points ahead at the top of the First Division with a 3–1 win at struggling Aston Villa, who are in danger of relegation four seasons after winning the European Cup and five years after being league champions.

28 December 1985 – A local derby at Villa Park sees Aston Villa and West Bromwich Albion draw 1–1.

29 January 1986 – The FA Cup fourth round replays sees Millwall beat Aston Villa 1–0.

12 February 1986 – The first legs of the League Cup semi-finals are played. Aston Villa draw 2–2 at home with Oxford United while Liverpool suffers a surprise 1–0 defeat at QPR.

28 February 1986 – Aston Villa have slipped into the relegation zone alongside West Midlands rivals West Bromwich Albion and Birmingham City.

1 March 1986 – Everton strengthen their hold on the top position in the First Division by beating Aston Villa 2–0 at home.

8 March 1986 – On the league scene, Aston Villa remain in the relegation zone after losing 4–1 at home to Arsenal.

12 March 1986 – Oxford United reach the League Cup final for the first time after beating Aston Villa 4–3 on aggregate.

22 March 1986 – A relegation crunch clash at Villa Park sees Birmingham City boost their own survival hopes and dent those of their local rivals Aston Villa with a 3–0 victory.

26 March 1986 – The return leg of the under-21 European Championship quarter-final sees England reach the next stage by drawing 1–1 with Denmark at Maine Road, with Aston Villa defender Paul Elliott equalising after the Danes took a 1–0 lead in the first half.

9 April 1986 – Aston Villa climb out of the bottom three with a 4–1 home win over Watford.

16 April 1986 – In a scrap to stay clear of the relegation zone at Villa Park, Aston Villa beat Ipswich Town 1–0. Birmingham City lose 2–0 at Tottenham and now need to win all three of their remaining games to stand any chance of avoiding relegation.

26 April 1986 – Wolverhampton Wanderers become the third West Midlands club to be relegated this season, and become only the second English league club ever to suffer three successive relegations, after their descent into the Fourth Division is confirmed. Liverpool defender Gary Gillespie scores a hat-trick in a 5–0 league win over relegated Birmingham City at Anfield. Chelsea's title challenge is over after they lose 3–1 at Aston Villa, whose victory takes them closer to survival. The First Division relegation battle takes a dramatic turn when Ipswich Town climb three places clear of the drop zone with a 3–2 win over Oxford United, who are still in the bottom three.

League table

References

Aston Villa F.C. seasons
Aston Villa